Cicindela, commonly known as common tiger beetles are generally brightly colored and metallic beetles, often with some sort of patterning of ivory or cream-colored markings. They are most abundant and diverse in habitats very often near bodies of water with sandy or occasionally clay soils; they can be found along rivers, sea and lake shores, sand dunes, around dry lakebeds, on clay banks, or woodland paths.

Etymology
The word "Cicindela" comes from the Latin word "cicindela", meaning "glowworm". This comes from the fact that members of the genus Cicindela are metallic and sometimes flashing.

Systematics
The genus Cicindela is (in its broadest historical sense) the largest genus of tiger beetles, and they occur worldwide. The status of the genus is constantly in a state of flux, as various authorities on different continents have vastly different opinions about which (if any) of the dozens of subgenera traditionally recognized within the genus are deserving of being accorded status as independent genera. Moreover, this is one of the few insect taxa in which the rank of subspecies has traditionally been used repeatedly, and essentially no two classifications consistently treat the various members of the genus as to which are species and which are subspecies.

Treated as a single genus, and even with a fairly conservative estimate of species, there are over 850 (or even up to 2,300) species in the group (thus being almost equal to the subtribe Cicindelina (W.Horn, 1908), with several thousand published names applied, collectively. Currently most of the subgenera below are not settled, being considered genera of their own by some, and subgenera of the genus Cicindela by others. The genus is divided into the following subgenera:

Cicindela (Ancylia)
Cicindela (Archidela)
Cicindela (Austrocicindela)
Cicindela (Brasiella)
Cicindela (Calochroa)
Cicindela (Calomera)
Cicindela (Cephalota)
Cicindela (Chaetodera)
Cicindela (Cicindela)
Cicindela (Cicindelidia)
Cicindela (Cosmodela)
Cicindela (Cylindera)
Cicindela (Duponti)
Cicindela (Euzona)
Cicindela (Fulgoris)
Cicindela (Habroscelimorpha)
Cicindela (Hypaetha)
Cicindela (Jansonia)
Cicindela (Lophyridia)
Cicindela (Macfarlandia)
Cicindela (Micromentignatha)
Cicindela (Myriochile)
Cicindela (Neolaphyra)
Cicindela (Opilidia)
Cicindela (Pachydela)
Cicindela (Pancallia)
Cicindela (Rivacindela)
Cicindela (Sophiodela)
Cicindela (Tribonia)

For a list of species, see List of Cicindela species.
The subgenus Cicindela (Cicindela), or Cicindela sensu stricto contains the following species:

Cicindela albissima
Cicindela altaica
Cicindela ancocisconensis
Cicindela arenicola
Cicindela asiatica
Cicindela bellissima
Cicindela campestris
Cicindela clypeata
Cicindela coerulea
Cicindela colombica
Cicindela decemnotata
Cicindela denverensis
Cicindela depressula
Cicindela dorsalis
Cicindela duodecimguttata
Cicindela fabrici
Cicindela formosa
Cicindela fulgida
Cicindela gallica
Cicindela gemmata
Cicindela granulata
Cicindela hirticollis
Cicindela hybrida
Cicindela iberica
Cicindela japana
Cicindela kozhantschikovi
Cicindela lacteola
Cicindela lengi
Cicindela lewisii
Cicindela ligi
Cicindela limbalis
Cicindela limbata
Cicindela longilabris
Cicindela lusitanica
Cicindela majalis
Cicindela marginata
Cicindela maroccana
Cicindela nebraskana
Cicindela nigrior
Cicindela ohlone
Cicindela oregona
Cicindela parowana
Cicindela patruela
Cicindela plutonica
Cicindela pugetana
Cicindela pulchra
Cicindela punctulata
Cicindela purpurea
Cicindela repanda
Cicindela resplendens
Cicindela restricta
Cicindela sachalinensis
Cicindela sahlbergii
Cicindela scutellaris
Cicindela sexguttata
Cicindela soluta
Cicindela songorica
Cicindela splendida
Cicindela sylvatica
Cicindela sylvicola
Cicindela tenuicincta
Cicindela theatina
Cicindela tranquebarica
Cicindela transbaicalica
Cicindela turkestanika
Cicindela waynei

Gallery

Notes

References
 Northeastern Tiger Beetles: A Field Guide to Tiger Beetles of New England and Eastern Canada by Jonathan G. Leonard and Ross T. Bell. CRC Press (1999).
 Tiger Beetles of Alberta: Killers on the Clay, Stalkers on the Sand by John Acorn. University of Alberta Press, 2001.
 Tiger Beetles: The Evolution, Ecology, and Diversity of the Cicindelids by David L. Pearson and Alfried P. Vogler. Cornell University Press, 2001.
 A Field Guide to the Tiger Beetles of the United States and Canada by David L. Pearson, C. Barry Knisley and Charles J. Kazilek. Oxford University Press, 2005.

External links
 

 
Taxa named by Carl Linnaeus